The 2019 Middle East-Africa Rugby League Championship was the second MEA Rugby League Championship, held in October 2019 at the Teslim Balogun Stadium in Lagos, Nigeria. The competition saw the international debut of Cameroon, Ghana and Nigeria, while Morocco played for the first time since the last MEA Championship, eight years previously.

Fixtures

First round

Play-offs

Media coverage

See also

Rugby league in Africa
International rugby league in 2019

References

MEA Rugby League Championship
MEA Rugby League Championship
Rugby league international tournaments
Rugby league in Africa
MEA Rugby League Championship